Archita Sahu is an Indian actress, model, and television personality with an established career in Odia Films. She was runner-up in the 2013 Femina Miss India, Kolkata. Her numerous accolades as an actress include four Odisha State Film Awards.

Early life

Sahu was born in Bhubaneswar, Odisha. She completed her education at D. M. School and B. Tech from KIIT University. She is also an Odissi dancer and won a national scholarship for the same.

In 2004, she was crowned Miss Kalinga.

In 2013, Sahu participated in Femina Miss India, Kolkata and emerged as a 1st runners up.

Film career
Her first Odia film, O My Love, was released in 2005. At the Odisha State Film Awards, she has been awarded Best Actress four times.

Other work
Sahu is the state Ambassador of UNICEF and Government of Odisha's "Eradication of child labour". She is also the ambassador of Junior Red Cross.

She was also a part of IPL 5 as brand ambassador of Deccan Chargers.

Personal life
On 1 March 2021, Sahu married actor Sabyasachi Mishra in Jaipur.

Filmography

Awards and accreditation 
Archita has won several awards in her film career to date, including three state awards by the Government of Odisha.
Star Entertainer of the year 2017, 9th Tarang Cine Awards 2018 for the film Shiva Not Out
Best Actor Female, 8th Tarang Cine Awards2017 for the film Bye Bye Dubai
Best Actor Female, 7th Tarang Cine Awards 2016 for the film Pilata Bigidigala
Best Actress, 6th Tarang Cine Awards 2015 for the film Smile Please
Best Actress, Oriya Film Fair Awards 2014 for the film Smile Please
 Best Actress, Odisha State Film Awards, 2013 for the film ACP sagarika
 Best Odia Actor (female), Filmfare Awards East, 2013 for the film Mu Eka Tumara
 Best Actress, Odisha State Film Awards, 2011 for the film Chocolate
 Best Actress, Odisha State Film Awards, 2009 for the film Pagala Karichi Paunji Tora
 Best supporting Actress, Odisha State Film Awards, 2006 for the film Babu I Love You
 Best Actor (female) Show Time, Puri
2006 for the film De Maa Shakti De
2008 for the film To Payeen Nebi Mu Sahe Janama
 Best Actress, Banichitra Award
 2006 for the film Babu I Love You
 2008 for the film To Payeen Nebi Mu Sahe Janama
 2009 for the film Mu Sapanara Soudagar
2010 Best Actress, Tarang Cine Awards
 2012  – Chocolate
 2010 – Pagala Karichi Paunji Tora
  Best Actor (female)  Etv Oriya Film Awards 2012 – Chocolate
 Best Actor (female) 2007  – To Bina Mo Kahani Adha by Omshree Awards
 Best Actor (female) 2008  – To Bina Mo Kahani Adha by UMPA
 Best Actor (female) 2009  – Mu Sapanara Soudagar by Sapatha
 Best Actor (female) 2009  – Mu Sapanara Soudagar by Chalachitra Jagat
 Best Actor (female) 2010  – Akashe Ki Ranga Lagila by Kamyab
 Best Actor (female) 2010  – Pagala Karichi Paunji Tora by Chitrapuri
 Best Actor (female) 2010  – Pagala Karichi Paunji Tora by UMPA
 Best Newcomer Award 2005  – O My Love

References

External links

 
 

Living people
Actresses from Bhubaneswar
Indian film actresses
Actresses in Odia cinema
Female models from Odisha
Odissi exponents
Indian female classical dancers
Performers of Indian classical dance
Dancers from Odisha
Kalinga Institute of Industrial Technology alumni
Year of birth missing (living people)
21st-century Indian actresses